Kavīndra Tīrtha (Sanskrit:कवीन्द्रतीर्थ); ( 1333 - 1398), was a Dvaita philosopher, saint, scholar and the seventh peetadhipathi of Madhvacharya Peetha  Raghavendra Math (Mantralayam) from 1392-1398.

Life
Kavindra is traditionally thought to be the brother of Rajendra in his previous stage of life, and identical with Viṣṇudāsācārya, the author of the Vādaratnāvalī. The latter is said to be revered by the former.  Other scholars assert that Viṣṇudāsācārya lived from 1390-1440 .

References

Bibliography
 
 
 
Edwin Gerow (ed.) (1990). The Jewel-Necklace of Argument: (the Vādaratnāvali of Viṣṇudāsācārya). New Haven, Conn: American Oriental Society, 1990.

1333 births
1398 deaths
Dvaitin philosophers
Uttaradi Math
Indian Hindu saints